Halikoti or Hali Koti may refer to:
 Halikoti, Amol
 Hali Koti, Babol Kenar, Babol County
 Hali Koti, Bandpey-ye Sharqi, Babol County